Shervin Adeli (born 4 May 1992) is an Australian professional futsal player who plays with the East Coast Heat and the Australia national futsal team. He also plays outfield 11 a side football for the Northern Tigers NPL club.

Career
Shervin Adeli has played for Australia in the 2010 AFC Futsal Championship, the 2016 FIFA Futsal World Cup, and the 2022 AFF Futsal Championship.

References

External links
FIFA profile

1992 births
Living people
Sportspeople from Melbourne
Australian men's futsal players
Australian people of Iranian descent
Sportspeople of Iranian descent